165 (one hundred [and] sixty-five) is the natural number following 164 and preceding 166.

In mathematics
165 is:
an odd number, a composite number, and a deficient number.
a sphenic number.
a tetrahedral number
the sum of the sums of the divisors of the first 14 positive integers.
a self number in base 10.
a palindromic number in binary (101001012) and bases 14 (BB14), 32 (5532) and 54 (3354).
a unique period in base 2.

In astronomy
 165 Loreley is a large Main belt asteroid
 165P/LINEAR is a periodic comet in the Solar System
 The planet Neptune takes about 165 years to orbit the Sun.

In the military
 Caproni Ca.165 Italian fighter aircraft developed before World War II
  was a United States Navy tanker, part of the U.S. Reserve Fleet, Beaumont, Texas
  was a United States Navy Barracuda-class submarine during World War II
  was a United States Navy  during World War II
  was a United States Navy  during World War II
 USS Counsel (AM-165) was a United States Navy  during World War II
  was a United States Navy minesweeper during World War II
  was a United States Navy Oxford-class technical research ship following World War II
  was a United States Navy  during World War I
  was a United States Navy  during World War II
  was a United States Navy  transport and cargo ship during World War II
  was a United States Navy yacht during World War I
 The 165 Squadron, Republic of Singapore Air Force Air Defence Operations Command, Republic of Singapore Air Force

In transportation
 British Rail Class 165
 The Blériot 165 was a French four-engine biplane airliner of the early 1920s
 The Cessna 165 single-engine plane of the 1930s
 LOT Polish Airlines Flight 165, en route from Warsaw to Cracow Balice airport crashed during a snowstorm on April 2, 1969

In other fields
165 is also:
 The year AD 165 or 165 BC
 165 AH is a year in the Islamic calendar that corresponds to 781 – 782 CE
 The atomic number of an element temporarily called Unhexpentium
 G.165 is a Telecommunication Standardization Sector standard for echo cancellers, used in telephony
 The human gene Zinc finger protein 165, or ZNF165

See also
 List of highways numbered 165
 United States Supreme Court cases, Volume 165
 United Nations Security Council Resolution 165
 Pennsylvania House of Representatives, District 165
 U.S. Income Tax sections 165(d) Professional Gamblers and 165(d) Recreational Gamblers

References

External links

 Number Facts and Trivia: 165
 The Number 165
 The Positive Integer 165
 VirtueScience: 165

Integers